"Yesterday & Today" is Do As Infinity's fourth single, released in 2000. It was used as the theme song for Fuji TV drama "Nisennen no Koi"."Raven" was used as the theme song for the movie "Uzumaki".

This song was included in the band's compilation albums Do the Best and Do the A-side.

Track listing
"Yesterday & Today"
"Raven"
"Glasses"
"Yesterday & Today" (Instrumental)
"Raven" (Instrumental)
"Glasses" (Instrumental)
"Oasis" (Dub's Highspeed Remix)

Chart positions

External links
 "Yesterday & Today" at Avex Network
 "Yesterday & Today" at Oricon

2000 singles
Do As Infinity songs
Songs written by Dai Nagao
Japanese television drama theme songs
2000 songs
Avex Trax singles
Song recordings produced by Seiji Kameda